The Singer may refer to:

Film
The Singer, the English release title of the 2006 film Quand j'étais chanteur, directed by Xavier Giannoli
The Singer, an unmade biopic about Héctor Lavoe
The Singer, a 2018 film directed by Steven Swancoat, starring Tayler Hamilton, James Kemp, Denis Woychuck, Mark DeMaio, Rachel Guest, and Arlo McGowan.

Music
"The Singer", poem by Edward Shanks set by Ivor Gurney
"The Singer", a version of "The Folk Singer" by Nick Cave and the Bad Seeds

Albums
The Singer (Liza Minnelli album), a 1973 album by Liza Minnelli
The Singer (Diamanda Galás album), a 1992 album by Diamanda Galás
The Singer (Lesley Garrett album), a 2002 album by Lesley Garrett
The Singer (Teitur Lassen album), a 2008 album by Teitur Lassen

See also
Singer 
Singer (disambiguation)